Ken C. Winters (born March 31, 1953) is an American psychologist known for his research on addictive behaviors such as problem gambling. He is a senior scientist at the Oregon Research Institute (MN location), a consultant for the National American Indian & Alaska Native Addiction Technology Transfer Center, and a Research Associate Professor for the Office of Research and Economic Development at Florida International University. He previously served as a tenured professor in the Department of Psychiatry at the University of Minnesota, as a Senior Scientist with the Philadelphia, Pennsylvania-based Treatment Research Institute, and an adjunct faculty member in the Department of Psychology at the University of Minnesota. He was founder and director of the University of Minnesota's Center for Adolescent Substance Abuse Research for twenty-five years, and in 2013, he was named chairman of the Scientific Advisory Board of the National Center for Responsible Gaming.

References

External links
Faculty page

Living people
1953 births
21st-century American psychologists
University of Minnesota faculty
University of Minnesota alumni
Stony Brook University alumni
20th-century American psychologists